Typhlocybini is a leafhopper tribe in the subfamily Typhlocybinae.

Genera 

 Agnesiella Dworakowska, 1970
 Aguriahana Distant, 1918
 Ahimia Dworakowska, 1979
 Almunisna Dworakowska, 1969
 Amurta Dworakowska, 1977
 Baaora Dworakowska, 1981
 Bellpenna Chiang, Hsu & Knight, 1989
 Bolanusoides Distant, 1918
 Borulla Dworakowska, Sohi & Viraktamath, 1980
 Byphlocyta Ahmed, 1971
 Caknesia Dworakowska, 1994
 Castoriella Dworakowska, 1974
 Choulima Zhang, 1989
 Columbonirvana Linnavuori, 1959
 Comahadina Huang & Zhang, 2010
 Dapitana Mahmood, 1967
 Dlabolaiana Dworakowska, 1974
 Dworakowskaia Chou & Zhang, 1985
 Edwardsiana Zachvatkin, 1929
 Empoa Fitch, 1851
 Eualebra Baker, 1899
 Eupterella DeLong & Ruppel, 1950
 Eupterycyba Dlabola, 1958
 Eupteryx Curtis, 1829
 Eurhadina Haupt, 1929
 Euzyginella Dietrich, 2013
 Fagocyba Dlabola, 1958
 Farynala Dworakowska, 1970
 Ficocyba Vidano, 1960
 Gratba Dworakowska, 1982
 Guheswaria Thapa, 1983
 Hellerina Dworakowska, 1972
 Henribautia Young & Christian, 1952
 Hiratettix Matsumura, 1931
 Knightipsis Dworakowska, 1969
 Kotwaria Dworakowska, 1984
 Kuantaochia Chiang, Lee & Knight, 1988
 Kuohzygia Zhang, 1990
 Labrangia Dworakowska, 1994
 Lautereriana Dworakowska, 1974
 Ledeira Dworakowska, 1969
 Limassolla Dlabola, 1965
 Limonella Chiang, Hsu & Knight, 1989
 Lindbergina Dlabola, 1958
 Linnavuoriana Dlabola, 1958
 Lowata Dworakowska, 1977
 Mahmoodia Dworakowska, 1970
 Marcelcyba Chiang, Hsu & Knight, 1989
 Mcateeana Christian, 1953
 Meketia Dworakowska, 1982
 Mindanaoa Mahmood, 1967
 Mordania Dworakowska, 1979
 Muluana Dworakowska, 1979
 Narta Dworakowska, 1979
 Ndokia Dworakowska, 1994
 Neozyginella Dietrich, 2013
 Omanesia Thapa, 1983
 Opamata Dworakowska, 1971
 Ossiannilssonola Christian, 1953
 Paracyba Vilbaste, 1968
 Parafagocyba Kuoh & Hu, 1992
 Parallelus Zhang, 1990
 Parathailocyba Zhang, Gao & Huang, 2012
 Paratyphlocyba Ahmed, 1985
 Parazyginella Chou & Zhang, 1985
 Pemoasca Mahmood, 1967
 Platycyba Matsumura, 1932
 Polluxia Dworakowska, 1974
 Pseudhadina Dietrich, 2013
 Pseudozyginella Dietrich, 2013
 Rabiana Mahmood, 1967
 Ramakrishnania Dworakowska, 1974
 Ribautiana Zachvatkin, 1947
 Rotundata Zhang, 1989
 Sacapome Schumacher, 1915
 Sannella Dworakowska, 1982
 Savitara Dworakowska, 1984
 Scinda DeLong & Ruppel, 1951
 Serratulus Mahmood, 1967
 Shamala Dworakowska, 1980
 Sundara Ramakrishnan & Menon, 1972
 Sylhetia Ahmed, 1972
 Tafalka Dworakowska, 1979
 Tahurella Dietrich, 2013
 Takagiana Dworakowska, 1974
 Tataka Dworakowska, 1974
 Thailocyba Mahmood, 1967
 Thampoa Mahmood, 1967
 Tosioma Theron, 1989
 Typhlocyba Germar, 1833
 Vatana Dworakowska, 1994
 Wagneriunia Dworakowska, 1969
 Warodia Dworakowska, 1970
 Wiata Dworakowska, 1972
 Yangida Dworakowska, 1994
 Yangisunda Zhang, 1990
 Yisiona Kuoh, 1981
 Zonocyba Vilbaste, 1982
 Zorka Dworakowska, 1970
 Zyginella Löw, 1885

References

External links 

 
Typhlocybinae
Hemiptera tribes